Rehema Chalamila (born May 15, 1982 in Tanzania Iringa), popularly known for her stage name Ray C, is a musician from Tanzania. Her genre of music is afro pop specifically bongo flava.

Biography 

Before venturing into music, she worked as a presenter for the Dar es Salaam-based Clouds FM radio station. She released her debut album "Mapenzi Yangu" in 2003.

She has toured Kenya, Uganda, Tanzania, Burundi, Rwanda, Mozambique, China, United Kingdom, Norway, Germany, Netherlands, Greece, Sweden, USA, Australia, Thailand, South Africa, India, Nigeria and other countries.

Discography 
Albums:
Mapenzi Yangu (2003)
Na Wewe Milele (2004)
Sogea Sogea (2006)
Touch Me (2008)

Awards 
Won:
2004 Tanzania Music Awards -  Best Female Artist 
2004 Kisima Music Awards - Female Artist from Uganda & Tanzania 
2007 Tanzania Music Awards - Best Female Artist 
Nominated:
2006 Pearl of Africa Music Awards - Best Female (Tanzania)
2005 Channel O Music Awards - Best African East
2007 Pearl of Africa Music Awards - Best Female (Tanzania) 
2008 Pearl of Africa Music Awards -  Best Female (Tanzania) 
2011 Tanzania Music Awards - Best Video, Best Song, Best Afro Pop Song and Best Collaboration Song  ('Mama Ntilie' with Gelly wa Ryme & AT)

References

External links 
Myspace profile

1982 births
Living people
21st-century Tanzanian women singers
People from Iringa Region
 Tanzanian Bongo Flava musicians